Milo Pressman is a fictional character played by Eric Balfour on the show 24.
During the events of Day 6, Milo works as the Internet Protocol Manager of the Los Angeles CTU Domestic Unit.

Characterization
Milo Pressman was born in 1978. He has a Bachelor of Science degree in Information Systems from the University of California, Los Angeles and a Master of Science degree in Computer Science from Stanford University. He worked as a security consultant for CTU in Day One. Following Day One, he returned to Division and received more field training.

Appearances

24: Season 1
Milo is an independent technological contractor, brought in to CTU to work on a key card that was left by now dead agent Richard Walsh. The key card contains information regarding the assassination plot against Senator David Palmer. When first introduced, Milo joins CTU to break into the keycard, but before he can do so, Jack Bauer is forced to switch the key card with a fake one for villain Ira Gaines. Milo then figures out that he has been working with a different key card, and he suspects that Jack may have switched it when he came to his desk. After Jamey Farrell is revealed as a mole, agent Nina Myers has Milo research Gaines’ identity, putting Milo in charge of all Jamey’s projects. Although Milo has narrowed the missing Teri Bauer's location down, it is still too large of an area to pinpoint the exact spot. Agent Tony Almeida finds an encrypted email on Jamey's computer and has Milo decode it. Milo then looks to find the remaining shooters.  At CTU, Milo briefs Jack about the three possible shooters he uncovered. One of them is Alexis, Victor Drazen's son who had been trained in Belgrade’s special forces. Milo forwards the photos of the suspected assassins to the Secret Service, and Agent Pierce shows them to the assembled Palmer campaign team. When Jack becomes suspicious of another mole being in CTU, he asks Milo to watch the servers for any classified information being leaked. Milo's last act for the day was notifying Jack that Robert Ellis (the connection between Bauer and Palmer to Operation Nightfall) was found murdered in New Orleans.

24: Season 6
Milo is back working at CTU. He frequently clashes with his underling Morris O'Brian, presumably due to the brief period in which he dated Morris' ex-wife Chloe.

After he discovers that fellow CTU operative Nadia Yassir has had restrictions placed on her because of her Arabic background, he takes matters into his own hands and signs Nadia in under his name, circumventing the restrictions in clear violation of the law. This allows her to work at her regular efficiency rate and even a higher security clearance.

Later that day, Milo accompanies Jack and Marilyn Bauer to the house where former Soviet General Dmitri Gredenko is supposedly staying.  Phillip Bauer, however, sets a trap for them, forcing Marilyn to send them to the wrong house, where a bomb kills several CTU field agents.  Phillip's men then attack, forcing Milo and Marilyn to flee.  Milo blows up CTU's truck in an effort to slow down their attackers, and the two flee on foot.  Milo hides Marilyn behind a dumpster and shoots at the men, but is shot in the right arm by one of the hostiles.  As the men prepare to execute Milo, Jack comes in and shoots the two men before they could kill Milo, whose bullet wound is not life-threatening.

When Milo returns to work a little over an hour later donning a sling, he clashes with newcomer Mike Doyle, with whom he has a bad history.

It is eventually revealed that Milo Pressman has a romantic interest in Nadia Yassir. After letting Nadia use his clearance code, she is worried that someone will find out she is using Milo's clearance code illegally, but Milo holds her hand and reassures her they will get through this together. When Nadia is revealed as a possible mole, he defends her and gets into another fight with Doyle, who says that Milo is "itching to sleep with her" because of his actions regarding Nadia's situation. Bill breaks up the fight and ultimately orders the removal of Nadia, despite protests from Pressman. Milo looks on helplessly as the guards escort Nadia to holding. While baffled at the mere fact Nadia is being accused of treason, a Division member and former Denver coworker, Connell Johnson, informs him there was evidence found that proves Nadia's innocence. Milo is then worried when he finds out that the evidence is with Doyle. Milo believes Mike will cover up the evidence to save himself (Mike) from the ridicule of physically interrogating an innocent person. He tries to scuffle with Doyle to try and prove his point, but Morris says that Mike did not cover anything up, but gave the evidence to Morris for confirmation that the evidence was valid. After Nadia is proven to be innocent, and Milo while setting up her workstation is told by Chloe that his feelings for Nadia are no secret in CTU, it is hard to determine whether she reciprocates those feelings. After she continues to reject his attempts at 'heart to hearts', A frustrated Milo pulls Nadia into a passionate kiss. On the next episode, Nadia Yassir tells Milo to forget about the suspicion of terrorism and not worry about their romantic attachments at that moment. Milo, agreeing, however says neither he or Nadia will forget the kiss. However, it comes right back when Milo questions why Nadia would show concern for an injured Doyle because of what he did to her. Nadia tells Milo that Mike isn't the bad guy Milo thought he knew to be and clashed with in Denver. Milo disagrees, and refuses to help her when Nadia has a system problem. They continue to argue until Morris settles the two down, and Milo, albeit reluctantly, proceeds to fix Nadia's problem.

As the day progresses, Milo becomes aware of Nadia's emerging feelings for Doyle, a situation that reached a climax in Episode 21 (2:00 AM–3:00 AM). Milo tells Nadia that although he will be hurt, he will be okay if Nadia and Mike have something between them. Nadia tells Milo she doesn't know what she feels and needs time to sort things out. At 2:42 AM, Cheng Zhi's men invade CTU and take the entire building hostage. Zhou, the head assailant, then asks for the person who is in command.  Nadia hesitates, and Milo steps forward and claims to be the Acting Director of CTU to protect her. A scared Nadia tries to signal to Milo to do nothing and sit down, but as he is asked to come forward, Milo looks at Nadia one last time and proceeds with his claim. Zhou then shoots him in the face, killing him instantly. Nadia is emotionally distressed after Milo's shooting, perhaps implying she was in love with Milo just as he was with her.

Later, Milo's brother Stuart comes to CTU to claim Milo's body and his personal belongings. Nadia meets him for the first time, and Stuart tells her that Milo talked about her and what Milo felt for Nadia. When Stuart asked how Milo was shot, Nadia tells him that he sacrificed his life to protect her from any danger that he feared might have happened — thus saving her life — and that he was a brave man for doing so. However, Stuart rebuffs the bravery comment by telling Nadia that Milo wasn't known to be brave, and that was not the reason Milo did what he did. Stuart says that Milo took her place because he really loved her.

References

Pressman, Milo
Television characters introduced in 2001